Sofia Arvidsson was the defending champion, but lost to Marina Erakovic in the second round in a replay of the previous final. Erakovic made it to the finals again, this year defeating Sabine Lisicki 6–1 in the first set after Lisicki retired due to illness before the start of the second set.

Seeds

Draw

Finals

Top half

Bottom half

Qualifying

Seeds

Qualifiers

Draw

First qualifier

Second qualifier

Third qualifier

Fourth qualifier

References
 Main Draw
 Qualifying Draw

U.S. National Indoor Tennis Championships - Singles
2013 Women's Singles
U.S. National Indoor Tennis Championships